"Music Sounds Better with You" is a 1998 single by Stardust.

Music Sounds Better with You may also refer to:

 Music Sounds Better with You (album), a 2011 album by Acid House Kings

See also
 "Music Sounds Better with U", a 2011 song by Big Time Rush featuring Mann